Allan Park can refer to:

 Allan Park, Aberdeen, former football ground of Cove Rangers F.C.
 Allan Park (Charleston)
 Allan Park, Ontario